Lionel John Kearns (born February 16, 1937) is a Canadian poet and teacher He was born in Nelson, British Columbia, and attended the University of British Columbia, where he was a student of Earle Birney. He later taught at Simon Fraser University.

Bibliography
Songs of Circumstance – 1963
Pointing – 1967
By the Light of the Silvery Mclune – 1969
Practising Up to Be Human – 1978
Ignoring the Bomb – 1982
Convergences – 1984
Foreign Aid
Environment

References
 Jim Andrews, On Lionel Kearns: A binary meditation on or contemporary wreading of the work of Lionel Kearns (2004).
 Lianne Moyes, "Dialoguing the Monologue of History and Lyric: Lionel Kearns' Convergences",  Open Letter 7, 5 (Summer 1989),15–27.
 Manina Jones, "Log Entries: Exploring discursive space in Lionel Kearns Convergences", in Douglas Barber, ed., Beyond Tish'''. (1991)

External links
 LionelKearns.com
 Records of Lionel Kearns are held by Simon Fraser University's Special Collections and Rare Books
 Archives of Lionel Kearns (Lionel Kearns fonds, R11758) are held at Library and Archives Canada

1937 births
Living people
20th-century Canadian poets
Canadian male poets
Alumni of SOAS University of London
People from Nelson, British Columbia
20th-century Canadian male writers